Atago jinja may refer to:

 Atago Jinja (Kyoto)
 Atago Shrine (Tokyo)